Didier André (born 3 September 1974) is a race car driver born in Lyon, France. In the late 1990s he competed in Indy Lights, driving in the Indy Racing League in 2001 and Nissan World Series from 2003 until the present day. During 2006 he drove in the Le Mans Series Championship, initially in LMP2 for the team Paul Belmondo Racing n°37 car, a Courage C65 with Ford power. Subsequently he moved to the LMP1 championship winning Pescarolo Sport squad, where he won at Donington and Jarama, partnering Jean-Christophe Boullion and Emmanuel Collard.

Racing record

24 Hours of Le Mans results

Complete American Open Wheel racing results
(key)

Indy Lights

Indy Racing League

References 

1974 births
Living people
French racing drivers
Indy Lights drivers
IndyCar Series drivers
24 Hours of Le Mans drivers
European Le Mans Series drivers
24 Hours of Spa drivers

Oreca drivers
Signature Team drivers
KTR drivers
PacWest Racing drivers
Pescarolo Sport drivers
OAK Racing drivers
W Racing Team drivers